Circumlocution (also called circumduction, circumvolution, periphrasis, kenning, or ambage) is the use of an unnecessarily large number of words to express an idea. It is sometimes necessary in communication (for example, to work around lexical gaps that might otherwise lead to untranslatability), but it can also be undesirable (when an uncommon or easily misunderstood figure of speech is used). Roundabout speech is the use of many words to describe something that already has a common and concise term (for example, saying "a tool used for cutting things such as paper and hair" instead of "scissors"). Most dictionaries use circumlocution to define words. Circumlocution is often used by people with aphasia and people learning a new language, where simple terms can be paraphrased to aid learning or communication (for example, paraphrasing the word "grandfather" as "the father of one's father"). Among other usages, circumlocution can be used to construct euphemisms, innuendos, and equivocations.

Language acquisition 
Circumlocution is often used by beginner and intermediate second language speakers to convey the meaning of a word they don't know in their target language. Relative clauses are often used for circumlocution in English. For example,[Firefighters] are the people who you call when your house is on fire.

A [spider] is an insect that catches other insects in its web.Synonyms and simile are two other common circumlocution strategies. A pomegranate could be described using these techniques as follows:It's a kind of fruit, it's red and it has lots and lots of little seeds in it.

Euphemisms

Euphemistic language often uses circumlocution to avoid saying words that are taboo or considered offensive. For example, "Holy mother of Jesus!" is a circumlocution of "Mary!", but "heck", while still euphemistic, is not a circumlocution of "hell".

Euphemistic circumlocution is also used to avoid saying "unlucky words"—words which are taboo for reasons connected with superstition: for example, calling the devil "Old Nick", calling Macbeth "the Scottish Play" or saying "baker's dozen" instead of thirteen.

Innuendo

Innuendo refers to something suggested but not explicitly stated.

Equivocation

Equivocation is the use of ambiguous language to avoid telling the truth or forming commitments.

See also 

 Analytic language
 Auxiliary verb
 Compound (linguistics)
 Inflection
 Periphrasis
 Sesquipedalianism
 Taboo (game)
 Verbosity

Notes

References

External links 

Circumlocution in figures of speech

Rhetoric
Figures of speech
Poetry articles needing expert attention